Minimal residual disease (MRD) is the name given to small numbers of leukaemic cells (cancer cells from the bone marrow) that remain in the person during treatment, or after treatment when the patient is in remission (no symptoms or signs of disease). It is the major cause of relapse in cancer and leukemia. Up until a decade ago, none of the tests used to assess or detect cancer were sensitive enough to detect MRD. Now, however, very sensitive molecular biology tests are available, based on DNA, RNA or proteins. These can measure minute levels of cancer cells in tissue samples, sometimes as low as one cancer cell in a million normal cells.

In cancer treatment, particularly leukaemia, MRD testing has several important roles: determining whether treatment has eradicated the cancer or whether traces remain, comparing the efficacy of different treatments, monitoring patient remission status as well as detecting recurrence of the leukaemia or cancer, and choosing the treatment that will best meet those needs.

The tests are not simple, are often part of research or trials, and some have been accepted for routine clinical use.

Background: the problem of minimal residual disease (MRD)

Most research on MRD has been done on leukaemia, particularly two types: adult chronic myeloid leukemia, and childhood acute lymphoblastic leukemia (the most common childhood cancer).

Leukemia is a cancer of cells in the blood, and primarily affects the bone marrow where they are made. For most human leukemias, the cause is not known. Risk factors can include chemicals and X-rays.

Leukemia involves a genetic abnormality that can begin in a single cell and then multiply rapidly, leading to a disruption in the proportion of cell types in the blood. When a bone marrow sample is drawn, leukemic cells can be viewed under a microscope.  Leukemic cells look like normal immature blood cells, and healthy marrow is often 1–2% immature (blasts) cells. However, in leukaemia, there are abnormally high numbers of immature cells, making up 40–90% of marrow. Additional examination of the bone marrow by tests including flow cytometry and FISH are necessary to diagnose the specific malignancy.

Symptoms do not occur until the disease is advanced, and there are 1 kg  or 1,000,000,000,000 leukemic cells in the body.

The initial five weeks of treatment kill most leukaemic cells, and the marrow begins to recover. Immature white blood cells may be present in the patient, although they are not necessarily malignant cells. In most cases, a few leukemic cells (approximately 0.001%) survive this treatment, and persist in the marrow for months or years. Cancerous cells can be identified by DNA-based or immunological tests, but they can not be identified as cancerous when viewed under a microscope.

About 30 years ago, leukemia was universally fatal. Patients were treated for a few weeks (rather than months or years as at present), producing remission, but nearly all patients relapsed after a few weeks or months. It is now known that minimal residual disease can regrow once treatment was stopped.  Genetic  tests can confirm the leukemic cells at relapse are descendants of those present when the disease first appeared.

Doctors aim to prevent relapse from occurring. Currently, most children do not relapse – the disease is "cured" at first attempt. If the disease relapses, it is usually more resistant to treatment than when first diagnosed. Patients who have relapsed once are at high risk of relapse in the future, and they may not respond as well to drugs they received in the past.

Tests which uncover minimal residual disease (one cancerous cell in a population of one million normal cells) are helpful for directing treatment and preventing relapse. A single remaining leukemic cell can be fatal, as malignant cells divide without control.  Conditioning regimens can continue as long as the patient is healthy enough to sustain damage by cytotoxic treatments.

Most research on MRD was done on leukemia and lymphomas. Researchers hope that the discoveries made can be applied to understand and treat other cancers.

Techniques for measuring minimal residual disease in leukaemia

DNA-based tests

These are based on detecting a leukaemic specific DNA sequence.  Generally this is achieved through the use of the polymerase chain reaction, a highly sensitive technique that underpins much of molecular biology. The DNA sequence chosen may contribute to the genesis of the leukaemia, or may simply be linked to it.

The markers used for DNA-based testing are often chromosomal translocations such as t(14;18) involving BCL2 and t(11;14) involving BCL1 (CCND1).  Other genes utilized for MRD detection include microsatellites, immunoglobulin and T cell receptor.

Some new techniques use Next-Generation Sequencing to detect MRD.

RNA-based tests

These are based on detecting a leukemic specific RNA sequence.  Generally this is achieved through the use of reverse transcription of the RNA followed by polymerase chain reaction.  RNA-based tests are normally utilized when a DNA test is impractical.  For example, the t(9;22) BCR-ABL translocation may occur over a large length of the chromosome which makes DNA-based testing difficult and inefficient.  However, RNA is a much less stable target for diagnostics than DNA and requires careful handling and processing.

The markers used for RNA-based testing are almost exclusively chromosomal translocations such as t(9;22) BCR-ABL, t(15;17) PML-RARA and t(12;21) ETV6-RUNX1 (TEL-AML1).

Patient-specific testing

Patient-specific MRD detection using immunoglobulin (IG) or T-cell receptors (TCR) is gaining popularity as a way of measuring MRD in leukemias that do not contain a chromosomal translocation or other leukemic specific marker.  In this case, the leukemic specific IG or TCR clone is amplified using PCR and the variable region of the IG or TCR is sequenced.  From this sequence, PCR primers are designed that will only amplify the specific leukemic clone from the patient.

Both the DNA and RNA based tests require that a pathologist examine the bone marrow to determine which leukaemic specific sequence to target.  Once the target is determined, a sample of blood or bone marrow is obtained, nucleic acid is extracted, and the sample analyzed for the leukaemic sequence. These tests are very specific, and detect leukaemic cells at levels down to one cell in a million, though the limit typically achieved is 1 in 10,000 to 1 in 100,000 cells. For comparison, the limit of what one can detect using traditional morphologic examinations using a microscope is about 1 cell in 100.

Immunological tests

Immunological-based testing of leukaemias utilizes proteins on the surface of the cells. White blood cells (WBC) can show a variety of proteins on the surface depending upon the type of WBC.  Leukaemic cells often show quite unusual and unique combinations (leukemic phenotype) of these cell surface proteins. These proteins can be stained with fluorescent dye labeled antibodies and detected using flow cytometry.  The limit of detection of immunological tests is generally about 1 in 10,000 cells and cannot be used on leukaemias that don't have an identifiable and stable leukaemic phenotype.

Use of and common targets in detection in different leukaemias, lymphomas and solid tumors

Acute lymphoblastic leukaemia (ALL)

Targets:
t(9;22) BCR-ABL, t(12;21) ETV6-RUNX1 (TEL-AML1), Patient specific assays for immunoglobulin and T cell receptor genes

Uses: Chromosomal translocation MRD detection is widely used as a standard clinical practice.  Patient specific assays are gaining acceptance but are still generally only used in research protocols.

Acute myeloid leukaemia (AML)

Targets:
t(15;17) PML-RARA, t(8;21) AML1-RUNX1T1 (AML-ETO), inv(16)

Uses: Chromosomal translocation MRD detection widely used as a standard clinical practice.

Chronic lymphocytic leukaemia

Targets:
Cell surface proteins, patient-specific assays for immunoglobulin and T cell receptor genes

Uses: Immunological methods are gaining wider use as more advanced flow cytometers are utilized for clinical testing.  Patient specific assays are still generally only used in research protocols.

Chronic myelogenous leukemia

Target:
t(9;22) BCR-ABL

Uses: MRD detection of the t(9;22) is considered standard of care for all patients with CML and is extremely valuable for patients being treated with imatinib mesylate (Gleevec/Glivec).

Follicular lymphoma

Targets:
t(14;18) IgH/BCL2, Patient specific assays for immunoglobulin and T cell receptor genes.

Uses: The t(14;18) is regularly used for MRD detection.  Patient specific assays are still generally only used in research protocols.

Mantle cell lymphoma

Targets:
t(11;14) IgH/CCND1 (IgH/BCL1), patient-specific assays for immunoglobulin and T cell receptor genes

Uses: The t(11;14) is regularly used for MRD detection, but the assay can only reliably detect 40–60%  of the t(11;14) translocations.  Patient-specific assays are still generally only used in research protocols.

Multiple myeloma

Targets:
M-protein levels in blood, patient-specific assays for immunoglobulin and T cell receptor genes (high levels of somatic hypermutation often prevent this assay from reliably working).

Uses: M-protein level in the blood is standard of care and is used for almost all patients with multiple myeloma.
Patient-specific assays are still generally only used in research protocols.

Solid tumors

Research into MRD detection of several solid tumors such as breast cancer and neuroblastoma has been performed.  These assays have been used to sample lymph nodes and blood for residual or metastatic tumor cells.  Applicable targets for MRD detection have been more difficult to determine in solid tumors and the use of MRD in solid tumors is much less advanced than the use in leukemia and lymphoma.

New research uses Whole genome sequencing and Artificial Intelligence to find MRD across multiple solid tumors.

Animal species other than humans

Leukaemias and lymphomas could potentially be monitored similarly in non-human animals, however, no known evidence of such veterinary applications exists to date.

Significance

Level of MRD is a guide to prognosis or relapse risk

In some cases, the level of MRD at a certain time in treatment is a useful guide to the patient's prognosis. For instance, in childhood leukaemia, doctors traditionally take a bone marrow sample after five weeks, and assess the level of leukaemia in that. Even with a microscope, they were able to identify a few patients whose disease had not cleared, and those patients received different treatment. MRD tests also make use of this time, but the tests are much more sensitive.

When past patients were studied, patients with high levels at this stage - here "high" means often leukaemia more than 1 cell in 1000 – were at risk of relapse. Patients with levels below 1 in 100,000 were very unlikely to relapse. For those in between, some relapsed. This led to the idea that MRD testing could predict outcome, and this has now been shown. The next step is whether, having identified a patient whom standard treatment leaves at high risk, there are different treatments they could be offered, to lower that risk. Several clinical trials are investigating this.

Other research groups have looked at other times in treatment - e.g. 3 months, 6 months, one year, or end of current treatment (two years) and these can predict outcome also.

There are also a few scientific studies, showing that level of MRD after bone marrow transplant, shows the risk of relapsing.

Monitoring people for early signs of recurring leukaemia

Another possible use is to identify if or when someone starts to relapse, early, before symptoms come back. This would mean regular blood or marrow samples. This is being explored mainly in chronic myeloid leukaemia (CML), where one can study the leukaemia in blood, which is easier to sample regularly than bone marrow. The molecular tests can show tumour levels starting to rise, very early, possibly months before symptoms recur.  Starting treatment early might be useful: the patient will be healthier; fewer leukaemic cells to deal with; the cells may be  amenable to treatment, since at clinical relapse they have often become more resistant to drugs used.

Individualization of treatment

This whole area comes under individualization of treatment, or if one prefers, identification of risk factors. Currently, most patient receive the same treatment, but leukaemia is a very variable disease, and  different patients probably have widely different treatment needs, to eradicate the disease.

For instance, the initial five-week induction treatment might rapidly clear disease for some patients. For others, the same treatment might leave significant amounts of disease. Measuring MRD level helps doctors decide which patients need what. In other words, it identifies patients' individual risks of relapse, and can theoretically allow them to receive just enough treatment to prevent it.

Without MRD information, doctors can do nothing but give the same treatment to all patients. They know that this will be inadequate for some and excessive for others, but there is little else they can do, as it is not possible to tell who needs what.  Identification of risk factors, to help individualise treatment, is a big field in medicine.

Treatment
Generally the approach is to bring a cancer into remission first (absence of symptoms) and then try to eradicate the remaining cells (MRD). Often the treatments needed to eradicate MRD differ from those used initially. This is an area of much research.

It seems a sensible idea to aim to reduce or eradicate MRD. What is needed is evidence on which is the best method, and how well it works. This is emerging. Treatments which specifically target MRD can include:

 intensive conventional treatment with more drugs, or a different combination of drugs
 stem cell transplant, e.g.  marrow transplant. This allows more intensive chemotherapy to be given, and in addition the transplanted bone marrow may help eradicate the minimal residual disease
 immunotherapy
 monitoring the patient carefully for early signs of relapse. This is an area of active research in several countries.
 treatment with monoclonal antibodies which target cancer cells
 cancer vaccines

Areas of current research and controversies

Clinical usefulness of MRD tests

It is important that doctors interpreting tests, base what they say on scientific evidence.  If one visits hospital and gets tested for something - e.g. a blood count - most of the tests are used often, and have been done thousands or millions of times before, on many different people. The doctors reading the test results have a large body of evidence to interpret what the results mean. By contrast, MRD tests are new, and the diseases are uncommon. The tests have been done on relatively few people. Consequently, there is less evidence available to guide doctors in interpreting the tests, or basing treatment decisions on them. In plain English, this means the doctors are likely to be very cautious, and rely more on other tests which they know and trust, than these, at least at present, while evidence is accumulating.

Method for testing, and when to test

There are controversies about the best times to test, and the best test method to use. There are national and international approaches to standardize these. In childhood leukaemia and chronic myeloid leukaemia, there appears to be consensus emerging.

Is there such a thing as a safe level of MRD

There is also controversy about whether MRD is always bad, inevitably causing relapse, or whether sometimes low levels are 'safe' and do not regrow. It is usually assumed that cancer cells inevitably  grow and that if they are present disease usually develops. But there is some evidence from animal studies, that leukaemic cells can lie dormant for years in the body and do not regrow. For this reason, it may be that the goal of treating MRD may be to reduce it to a "safe" level - not to eradicate it completely.

Is MRD testing useful for all patients?

Some types of leukaemia are difficult to treat. In these, it is not clear how MRD testing would help. The patients may not do well on current treatment, but sometimes it is not clear what other treatment, if anything, might be better. There is thus an argument that as the test is not necessary: it might involve an additional procedure for the patient; it will contribute no useful information on treatment, it is not necessary.

Testing by hospitals and other labs

Where done

MRD testing is not yet a routine test, nor is it carried out in all places.

Currently most MRD testing - in Leukemia Research - is done during clinical trials, and would be funded as part of that trial, for patients enrolled on the trial.  The tests are specialised, so samples are usually sent to a central reference laboratory in each region or country. The tests are not done in most routine diagnostic labs, as they tend to be complex, and also would be used relatively infrequently.

Cost

MRD testing is technically demanding and time-consuming; the tests are expensive, so are usually available only through specialist centres, as part of clinical trials.

Availability of testing

At the time of writing (Jan 2017), MRD testing is available in some clinical trials in the UK, Europe, Australia, China and the US.

Interpretation of test results

Most clinical tests used to guide treatment - e.g. even a simple blood count - have been done millions of times, and doctors can interpret the results confidently, based on this extensive previous knowledge.  By contrast, MRD tests are new and have been carried out on relatively few people (a few thousand at most). Researchers and doctors are still building the extensive database of knowledge needed to show what MRD tests mean.

The consequence: unless a patient is enrolled on a trial which requires the test, clinicians tend to be somewhat cautious about requesting it, and cautious about interpreting the results. This is likely to change in future, as tests become more routine.

Resources

General
Minimal Residual Disease. Website. Modern MRD Detection Technologies. July 2013.
 Leukaemia Research Fund (United Kingdom)
Children with Leukaemia (United Kingdom)

Textbooks

Research papers

References

Leukemia